The 1938 Isle of Man Tourist Trophy saw the Senior TT lap record of 90.27 mph set by Freddie Frith the previous year broken in 1938 when Harold Daniell completed a lap at 91.00 mph on his Norton, a record which would stand for 12 years. He won, beating Stanley Woods by only 14.4 seconds. Stanley Woods won the Junior, with Harold Daniell coming fifth, while Ewald Kluge on a DKW won the Lightweight. Kluge was the second Lightweight TT winning non-British rider in a row, Omobono Tenni having won the previous year.

Between 1931 and 1937 Norton had six Senior-TT wins with the long-stroke CamShaft One (CS1) engine. Norton entered the 1938 Senior TT with a new short-stroke engine, new telescopic front forks, and won for the 7th time, with rider Harold Daniell.

Eric Oliver, who later won 4 sidecar World Championships, was entered this year, but retired his Norton from the Junior TT with a broken chain.

Senior TT (500cc)

Junior TT (350cc)

Lightweight TT (250cc)

Notes
 Improvements to the course include road-widening and resurfacing work at Greeba Bridge, Sulby Straight and the 26th Milestone.

Sources

External links
 Detailed race results
 Isle of Man TT winners

Isle of Man TT
1938
Isle